Sauli Zinovjev  (born 1988) is a Finnish composer. Zinovjev was born in Lahti, and studied composition in Sibelius Academy (2010–15) and in HfM-Karlsruhe (2013–14) under guidance of Tapio Nevanlinna and prof. Wolfgang Rihm. Zinovjev's works are published exclusively by HarrisonParrott's Birdsong Music Publishing.

Zinovjev's focus has been on orchestral music and his works have been performed by for example Oslo Philharmonic, Bamberg Symphony Swedish Radio Symphony Orchestra, Finnish Radio Symphony Orchestra and Helsinki Philharmonic Orchestra  in collaboration with musicians such as Klaus Mäkelä, Pekka Kuusisto, Sakari Oramo, André de Ridder and Okko Kamu . For the season 2021-2022 Zinovjev was granted a fellowship to the Internationales Künstlerhaus Villa Concordia and in 2019 he was appointed as the Composer-in-Residence of the 60th Turku music festival.

On the concert season 2021–2022 Zinovjev's music will debut with the Tokyo Metropolitan Symphony Orchestra 
and Müncher Philharmoniker.
In January 2022 the pianist Víkingur Ólafsson premiered a new Piano concerto by Sauli Zinovjev with the Finnish Radio Symphony Orchestra and Klaus Mäkelä.

In 2014 Zinovjev's composition "Gryf" was awarded the 3rd prize in the 3rd International Uuno Klami Composition Competition.

Main works 
 Wiegenlied (2020), 11', orchestra (3333/4331/1+3/arpa/archi), commissioned by the Oslo Philharmonic, Gothenburg Symphony and Helsinki Philharmonic Orchestras
 Piano concerto (2019), 27', piano solo and orchestra (2333/4331/1+3/solo pf./archi), commissioned by the Finnish and Swedish Radio Symphony Orchestras
 "Un Grande Sospiro" (2018), 22, orchestra (2222/2200/2/archi), commissioned by Tapiola Sinfonietta,  Kymi Sinfonietta & Orchestre de Chambre de Lausanne
 "Die Welt - Ein Tor", 16', cello solo and orchestra (2222/2200/1+1/solo vlc./archi), commissioned by the Paulo Foundation
 Violin concerto "Der Leiermann" (2017), 23', violin solo and orchestra (2232/4330/1+1/hp/solo vl./archi), commissioned by the Oulu Sinfonia
 "Batteria" (2016), 10', orchestra (3333/4331/1+3/pf+hp/archi), commissioned by the Finnish Radio Symphony Orchestra

Discography
"Sospirando 2" - Harri Kuusijärvi & Markus Hohti (SZ Publishing, 2020)
"Batteria" - Finnish Radio Symphony Orchestra & Andre de Ridder (SZ Publishing, 2019)
"Piano Quartet Chasse-Neige" - Ensemble Recherche (SZ Publishing, 2019)
"Chained" - Harri Kuusijärvi (A Live, Art First Records, 2017)
Elegietta - Otto Tolonen (Toccata, Sibarecords SACD-1011, 2013)

References

External links 
 Sauli Zinovjev's official webpage
 Birdsong by HarrisonParrott
 Music Finland

1988 births
Living people
21st-century classical composers
Finnish classical composers
Finnish male classical composers
21st-century male musicians
21st-century Finnish composers